The 1936 Colorado Buffaloes football team was an American football team that represented the University of Colorado as a member of the Rocky Mountain Conference (RMC) during the 1936 college football season. Led by second-year head coach Bunny Oakes, Colorado compiled an overall record of 4–3 with a mark of 4–2 in conference play, placing fourth in the RMC.

Schedule

References

Colorado
Colorado Buffaloes football seasons
Colorado Buffaloes football